Rune Ottesen (born 7 February 1954) is a former Norwegian footballer who played as a midfielder for Vard Haugesund and Bryne. He won seventeen caps for Norway between 1975 and 1981 and scored one goal, in a 2–1 win over Sweden in 1977.

References

Norwegian footballers
1954 births
Norway international footballers
SK Vard Haugesund players
Bryne FK players
Living people
Association football midfielders